is a Japanese tokusatsu television series produced by Tsuburaya Productions and broadcast on TV Tokyo. This series is the 28th entry to the Ultra Series, released to commemorate its 50th anniversary of the Ultra Series and is the first one since Ultra Galaxy Mega Monster Battle: Never Ending Odyssey not to be a part of Ultraman Retsuden/New Ultraman Retsuden. Similar to its preceding series, Ultraman X, Orb is also simulcasted in North America via Crunchyroll. The series was also released on Toku on July 2, 2018, and then added to its streaming platform the following month.

Story

A long time ago, Earth was on the brink of destruction after Lord Monsters wreaked havoc, but the monsters were sealed with the help of Ultra Warriors.

In the present day, these monsters were unsealed by Jugglus Juggler as cases of monster attacks started to appear in Japan. During Maga-Basser's attack, Gai made his debut by saving Naomi, the leader of the paranormal website SSP and started his mission to stop the resurrection of Lord Monsters while taking refuge in the SSP's office. Unknown to the others, Gai secretly transforms into Ultraman Orb, a warrior of light who borrows the power of past Ultra Warriors upon losing his original form to fight against frequent monster attacks while facing Juggler, his original ally turned adversary after being rejected to be chosen for Orb's power. In the middle of the series, Juggler awakened the legendary monster Maga-Orochi who surpasses Orb in every one of his available forms. Through the use of Zoffy and Ultraman Belial's powers as Thunder Breastar, Gai/Orb managed to defeat the infamous destroyer but his little control of its immense power almost killed Naomi when she was captured by Galactron. After learning to have faith in his strength, Gai manages to control Thunder Breastar and regains his lost form, Orb Origin.

At the end of the series, it was revealed that Maga-Orochi survived and matured into its original form Magata no Orochi. Its awakening was sensed by various monsters and aliens on Earth, with several of them already having left Japan and caused an unstable change of climate. Juggler tricked the VTL Squad into launching their strongest missile, which unintentionally helped the monster in its revival while proceeding to consume the entire planet. Following Orb's defeat, he took this opportunity to taunt Gai by attempting to kill Naomi in front of him but failed to do so when she claimed responsibility of her own death. Juggler's action of saving Naomi brings forth a revelation that he had rescued her ancestor Natasha during the year 1908, allowing him to be redeemed in front of his own rival Gai. When assisting Orb in facing Magata no Orochi, Juggler held off the monster long enough for the Ultra to use his predecessor's powers and destroy it. In the aftermath of the battle, Gai decided to depart on his travel once more while Juggler survived his apparent destruction and watched the former's departure from a safe distance.

Episodes

Production

Prior to the conception of the series, a promotional video was made by Tsuburaya Productions released via YouTube on January 24, 2016 to celebrate the 50th anniversary of the Ultra Series, dating back to the first series, Ultra Q through Ultraman X. At the end of the video, a black background with a pair of Ultraman eyes can be seen, with the English letters "What's next...?" shown. On February 6, Field Corporation, the parent company of Tsuburaya Productions Co., Ltd., revealed in a financial presentation on February 1 that a new Ultraman series will premiere in July. However, the report did not reveal any other information about the new series.

On April 25, 2016, Japanese newspaper Sports Hochi announced and revealed the details of the new entry in the Ultra Series, Ultraman Orb. Kiyotaka Taguchi, who directed the previous year's Ultraman X series, was once again set to be the  director, with Yuji Kobayashi and Takao Nakano returning as the series' writers. Taguchi stated that the series will have "themes of traveling the noble path and returning to one's roots, while still being a funny and interesting Ultraman series". Aside from celebrating the 50th anniversary of the Ultra Series, it also aims to attract the series' fans since the past years. This news was finally followed by Orb's appearance in episode 147 of New Ultraman Retsuden and a promotional video of the series, both launched on April 30, 2016.

In an interview for the Uchusen summer 2016 magazine, the "wandering protagonist" concept had long been in development since the last two Ultra Series, Ultraman Ginga S and Ultraman X. The original character conception for Gai Kurenai, the series' protagonist, was based on Dan Moroboshi/Ultraseven, the protagonist of the 1967 Ultra Series, Ultra Seven, with Takao Nakano including additional motives to the character. Additionally, Gai's concept was envisioned as a "What if?" variation should Dan never scouted to be recruited as a member of the Ultra Guard. According to Nakano, Gai's main rival, Jugglus Juggler is based on "a stereotypical worthy opponent to the wanderers". While developing the leading cast, Taguchi requested for the removal of any research department in the shows attack teams, instead opting to have the VTL Squad, the show's attack team, be portrayed as "ordinary street officers". The name of the antagonist kaiju, was created to sound appealing to the child audience.

The Uchusen autumn 2016 revealed an interview with writers Yuji Kobayashi and Takao Nakano, the decision of having a protagonist as an Ultraman in disguise is to counter the elements of a bond between an Ultraman and human host that was portrayed in the last year series' Ultraman X. Under Taguchi's supervision, each episode was added with both the elements of light and seriousness. The original idea behind the SSP was to follow the example of Kogoro Akechi, the fictional character from Edogawa Ranpo's novel series, The Boy Detectives Club.

On July 14, Tsuburaya announced the release of team SSP's official website which focuses on their adventure with monsters in the series, as well as their meeting with Ultraman Orb.

Casting
When Sports Hochi newspaper first announced the new series, Ultraman Orb, Hideo Ishiguro was revealed to be the lead actor of the series, as the main protagonist Gai Kurenai. According to Hideo, he has been a fan of the Ultra Series since his childhood, but never expected to land a role on the series himself. Unlike the actors of recent Heisei era Ultra Series, Hideo is in fact an experienced actor instead of a rookie/newcomer actor.

The rest of the series' casts were later announced by the official Tsuburaya Productions website on May 26, 2016. On June 9, a press conference of the series was held at the Tokyo Toy Show 2016, with the attendance being the show's main cast and singers. Ichiro Mizuki collaborated with Voyager members TAKUYA and Chiaki Seshimo to perform the series' opening theme. At the same time, official websites for the series were given updates and another promotional video for the series was released. During the final stage greeting for Ultraman X The Movie, which was held as a sign of departure from the Ultraman X cast to their spectators, Ultraman Orb appeared as the guest of honor and was greeted by Kensuke Takahashi, Daichi Ozora's actor.

Reception
In a financial report revealed by Fields Corporation, viewing figures for the show's online streaming showcase a massive 89% increase from the previous series Ultraman X. As of episode 15, the show's worldwide streaming figures total is 480 million.

Ultraman Orb Chronicle
The production of further episodes depended on the success of the movie and asked everyone to support it.

Other appearances

Films and team-ups
Ultraman Geed The Movie (2018): See here
Ultraman R/B (2018): In this show, a copy of Ultraman Orb's power was exploited by Makoto Aizen to transform into a black knockoff of the original hero, Ultraman Orb Dark.
Ultra Galaxy Fight: New Generation Heroes/Ultraman Taiga (2019)/Ultraman Taiga The Movie (2020): See here.
Ultraman Z (2020): In this show, Jugglus Juggler returns as a supporting character under his alias Shota Hebikura.

Ultraman Fusion Fight!
In response to the series' premier, a Data Carddass arcade game had been launched, called  on July 31, 2016. The game is based on Ultraman Orb's Fusion Up ability, which involves players inserting two Ultra Fusion Cards to create a combination form for Orb, either in-series or game-exclusives. Accordingly, there are 56 cards in existence.

Ultraman Orb: The Chronicle
 is a biography series of Ultraman Orb that had aired on January 6, 2018.

Cast
/: 
: 
: 
: 
: 
: 
: 
Orb Ring Voice:

Guest cast

Public bath owner (3): 
: 
: 
Jetta's father (9): 
: 
: 
: 
: 
: .

Songs
Opening theme

Lyrics & Composition: 
Arrangement: Toshihiko Takamizawa with 
Artists:  with 
Episodes: 1-13 (Verse 1), 14-24 (Verse 2)
During the Pre-Premiere Special and the final episode, this song is played as an ending theme.

Ending theme
"Shine your ORB"
Lyrics: TAKERU and Chiaki Seshimo
Composition & Arrangement: 
Artists: Voyager feat. Gai Kurenai (Hideo Ishiguro) & SSP (Miyabi Matsuura, Naoto Takahashi and Hiroaki Nerio)
Episodes: 1-13 (Verse 1), 14-24 (Verse 2)

International broadcast
In Hong Kong, this series aired on ViuTV on June 6, 2017.
In Malaysia, this series also aired on Astro Ceria on September 29, 2017.
In Indonesia, this series also aired on Rajawali Televisi on August 25, 2018.

See also
Ultra Series - Complete list of official Ultraman-related shows

Notes

References
Bibliography
 

Sources

External links
Ultraman Orb at Tsuburaya Productions 
Ultraman Orb at TV Tokyo 
Ultraman Fusion Fight! 
Ultraman Orb at Bandai 
SSP (Something Search People) Official Site 

2016 Japanese television series debuts
2016 Japanese television series endings
Ultra television series
TV Tokyo original programming
Television series set in fictional countries